Diarmuid Hegarty is the president of Griffith College in Ireland. He is also chairman of the Friends of the Vocal Arts.

Early life and education

Diarmuid Hegarty was born in Dublin. He studied Commerce (BComm) at University College Dublin and obtained a Barrister at Law (BL) degree from the Honorable Society of King's Inns.

From 1969 to 1973, he trained to be an accountant with Coopers and Lybrand.

Hegarty is a Barrister-at-Law and a Fellow of the Institute of Chartered Accountants in Ireland.

Career 
In 1974, Hegarty became a Taxation Consultant with constituent firm of Deloitte and Touche. That same year, Hegarty founded Business and Accounting Training, which grew into Griffith College Ireland. The college operated from Milltown, St. Stephen's Green and Morehampton Road, Dublin, In 1978, BAT college was incorporated. The name was changed to Griffith College when the college moved to the former Griffith Barracks in 1991.

In 1992, he became president of Griffith College Ireland. From 1999 to 2006, he served as a board member of Griffith College Karachi. As president of Griffith College, Hegarty has been involved in promoting the Bologna Process for a Europe-wide Higher Education Network.

In 2018 he was elected to the Council of Dublin Chamber of Commerce.

Selected roles
 2011: Chairman of the Higher Education Colleges Association (HECA),
 2012: Received an Honorary Professorship from the Beijing Information Science & Technology University (BISTU) in China and was made an Honorary Member of the University's academic board
 2018 - Elected as a Council Member  to Dublin Chamber of Commerce
 Chairman of the Las Adelfas Hotel partnership, in which he has a business interest.
 Vice-Chairman of the Ireland-Pakistan Business Council.

References

Year of birth missing (living people)
Dublin
Living people
Irish scholars and academics
Businesspeople from Dublin (city)
Place of birth missing (living people)
Alumni of King's Inns